The South and Central Women's Club Handball Championship, organized by the South and Central America Handball Confederation, is the official competition for women's handball clubs of South and Central America qualifying the champion of the competition to the IHF Women's Super Globe.

Summaries

Medal table

Per Club

Per Nation

References

External links
 Coscabal official website

 
Handball
South and Central America Handball Confederation competitions
Women's handball competitions
Recurring sporting events established in 2016

Women's sports competitions in South America
Recurring sporting events established in 2019